MS Michael Sars is a training ship operated by Alandica Shipping Academy in Åland. The ship is named after the Norwegian marine biologist Michael Sars.

She was built in 1979 as a research vessel for the Norwegian Institute of Marine Research in Bergen. She was sold in 2003 and has since 2005 been a training ship in the Åland Islands by university and vocational levels, as well as training of seafarers.

Michael Sars is owned by Åland and operated by Alandica Shipping Academy (formerly Åland Maritime Safety Center).

Bilder

References 

Training ships 
1979 ships
Research vessels of Norway
Ships built in Bergen